Ile aux Souris is an island in Seychelles, lying in the eastern shores of Mahe.

With a 14-metre elevation ‘it stands just inside the long line of coral reef fringing the coasts of Anse Royale and Anse Bougainville. It is rocky, about 500 metres south west of Pointe au Sel.
In the vicinity you can find the Seychelles university.

The island belongs to Anse Royale District.

Image gallery

References

External links 
 Mahe Map 2015
 Info on the island
Islands of Mahé Islands
Uninhabited islands of Seychelles